MBC 1 may refer to:
 		 		
 MBC 1 (Mauritian TV channel), a TV channel in Mauritius by the Mauritius Broadcasting Corporation
 MBC1 (Middle Eastern and North African TV channel), a television channel in Dubai, United Arab Emirates